As of August 2022, Iran Air flies to the following destinations listed below.

References

Iran Air
Iran Air